Gladys Luscombe (13 November 1908 – 6 June 1946) was a British diver. She competed in the women's 3 metre springboard event at the 1924 Summer Olympics.

References

External links
 

1908 births
1946 deaths
British female divers
Olympic divers of Great Britain
Divers at the 1924 Summer Olympics
People from Newton Abbot